Sir William Mitchell (27 March 186124 June 1962) was an Australian philosopher and academic. He was Professor of English Language, Literature, Mental and Moral Philosophy at the University of Adelaide from 1894–1922, Vice-Chancellor 1916–1942 and Chancellor 1942–1948.

Education
Mitchell was educated at the University of Edinburgh where he graduated with a Master of Arts degree with first class honors in 1886, followed by a doctor of science in 1891 from the Department of Mental Science. At Edinburgh, Mitchell's thesis was supervised by Alexander Campbell Fraser, and he was assistant to Henry Calderwood.

Career
Mitchell was an enthusiast for literary societies, and was in 1883 a foundation member of the South Australian Literary Societies' Union, served as its president in 1901, and remained a staunch supporter of the Union in 1937. Mitchell was Professor of English Language, Literature, Mental and Moral Philosophy at the University of Adelaide from 1894–1922. He also held the position of Vice-Chancellor from 1916–1942 and was Chancellor from 1942–1948.

Mitchell wrote about issues overlapping philosophy of mind and science, neurology, quantum theory and philosophical psychology.

His work is the subject of a book by W. Martin Davies, The Philosophy of Sir William Mitchell, 1861–1962 : A Mind's Own Place (2003) .

He is also the benefactor of The Professor Sir William Mitchell Prize for Philosophy, Level II, and gives his name to the South Australian Electoral District of Mitchell.

Personal life
On 18 January 1900 William Mitchell married Marjory Erlistoun Barr Smith (1868 – 3 August 1913), fourth daughter of Robert Barr Smith. Their daughter Joanna "Nan" Mitchell (1900– ) married Major David Thompson, of Farnham House, Farnham Royal. Buckinghamshire c. 1 May 1925.

Honours
Mitchell was knighted in 1927.

Footnotes

References

External links
 William Mitchell article in the Internet Encyclopedia of Philosophy

1861 births
1962 deaths
People from Falkirk
20th-century Australian philosophers
Scottish emigrants to Australia
Academic staff of the University of Adelaide
Vice-Chancellors of the University of Adelaide
Australian centenarians
Men centenarians
Australian Knights Bachelor